Countess of Loudoun is the title which may be held by a woman in her own right or given to the wife of the Earl of Loudoun. Women who have held the title include:

Countesses in their own right 
Flora Mure-Campbell, Marchioness of Hastings (6th Countess of Loudoun; 1780-1840)
Edith Rawdon-Hastings, 10th Countess of Loudoun (1833-1874)
Edith Abney-Hastings, 12th Countess of Loudoun (1883-1960)
Barbara Abney-Hastings, 13th Countess of Loudoun (1919-2002)

As wife of the Earl of Loudoun 
Barbara Rawdon-Hastings, Marchioness of Hastings (1810-1858)

Other
She foundered in 1816 in the China Sea.